Kahramanmaraş Sütçüimam University (KSU) is a public university founded 1992 in Kahramanmaraş, Turkey. The university carries out its academic activities in the campus located in the Avsar Campus, Bahceli evler, Karacasu, The Faculty of Medicine and Aksu campuses. Karacasu campus has an area of 100 hectares and Avsar campus, which is still under construction, will have an area of 1,300 hectares. 266 hectares of this area have been nationalized up to now.

There are totally 170 departments and programs in our university ; 45 departments including the second education program in 11 faculties and 12 in higher vocational schools, 93 programs in higher vocational schools, 17 departments in the Institute of Natural Sciences, 9 departments in the Institute of Social Sciences, 6 departments subordinated to the Rectorate.

Graduate Schools 
 Graduate School of Science and Technology
 Graduate School of Social Sciences
 Graduate School of Health Sciences

Under Graduate Schools 
 Faculty of Agriculture
 Faculty of Education
 Faculty of Economics and Administrative Sciences
 Faculty of Engineering and Architecture
 Faculty of Fine Arts
 Faculty of Forest
 Faculty of Health Sciences
 Faculty of Literature
 Faculty of Medicine
 Faculty of Sciences
 Faculty of Theology

Schools
 School of Afşin Health
 School of Foreign Languages
 School of Göksun Applied Sciences
 School of Physical Education and Sports

Vocational Schools 
 Afşin Vocational School
 Andırın Vocational School
 Goksun Vocational School 
 Health Assistance Vocational School
 Pazarcık Vocational School
 Türkoğlu Vocational School
 Vocational School of Technical Sciences
 Vocational School of Social Sciences

Research Centers
 Oral And Dental Health Education Application And Research Center
 KSU Siyer-I Nebi Research Application and Research Center (SAMER)
 Atatürk's Principles And Revolution History Application And Research Center
 European Union Ar. And App. Central
 Computer Research and Application Center (BAUM)
 Prof. Dr. Nurettin KAŞKA Hard Shelled Fruit App. And Ar. MR. (SEKAMER)
 Strategic Research Center
 Biomedical Application and Research Center
 Environmental Problems Application And Research Center
 Agricultural Publication Research And Application Center
 University - Industry - Public Cooperation Development Application and Research Center
 Earthquake Research And Risk Management Center
 Eastern Mediterranean Archeology Application and Research Center (DOĞAKMER)
 Ecological Agriculture Application and Research Center (EKOTAUM)
 Animal Production Application and Research Center. (HAYMER)
 Research And Application Center Of Kahramanmaraş And Its Region Cultural Values
 Women's Studies Application and Research Center (KSÜKAM)
 Career And Entrepreneurship Application And Research Center (KAGİM)
 KSU Child Education Application and Research Center
 Distance Education Application and Research Center (UZEM)
 Turkish Teaching Application and Research Center (TÖMER)

Education Centers
Continuing Education Center
Distance Education Center
Turkish Language Teaching Center

Laboratories
University-Industry-Government Cooperation Development Research Center

References

4. Email Aç

External links 
 Kahramanmaraş Sütçü İmam University 
 ACM Digital Library Institutional Profile 
 Facebook Page

State universities and colleges in Turkey
Buildings and structures in Kahramanmaraş